A client state, in international relations, is a state that is economically, politically, and/or militarily subordinate to another more powerful state (called the "controlling state"). A client state may variously be described as satellite state, associated state, dominion, condominium, self-governing colony, neo-colony, protectorate, vassal state, puppet state, and tributary state.

Controlling states in history

Persia, Greece, and Rome

Ancient states such as Persia and Parthia, Greek city-states, and Ancient Rome sometimes created client states by making the leaders of that state subservient, having to provide tribute and soldiers. Classical Athens, for example, forced weaker states into the Delian League and in some cases imposed democratic government on them. Later, Philip II of Macedon similarly imposed the League of Corinth. One of the most prolific users of client states was Republican Rome which, instead of conquering and then absorbing into an empire, chose to make client states out of those it defeated (e.g. Demetrius of Pharos), a policy which was continued up until the 1st century BCE when it became the Roman Empire. Sometimes the client was not a former enemy but a pretender whom Rome helped, Herod the Great being a well-known example. The use of client states continued through the Middle Ages as the feudal system began to take hold.

Chinese dynasties

Ottoman Empire

The number of tributary or vassal states varied over time but notable were the Khanate of Crimea, Wallachia, Moldavia, Transylvania, Sharifate of Mecca and the Sultanate of Aceh.

19th and 20th centuries

Russian Empire

The Austro-Hungarian Empire tried to make Serbia a client state in order to form a Christian opposition to the Ottoman Empire, but after the 1903 May Coup, Serbia came under the influence of Russia, which was forming a pan-Eastern Orthodox opposition to the Latin Christianity represented by the Austro-Hungarian empire. In 1914, Russia repeatedly warned the Austro-Hungarian Empire against attacking Serbia. When it did attack, Russia mobilized its army. Russia also wanted Bulgaria and Montenegro as client states.

At the time, Great Britain and Austria both considered Serbia as a client state controlled by Russia, and most historians today might call Serbia a client state, but historian Christopher Clark, author of The Sleepwalkers: How Europe Went to War in 1914, in a 2014 conference on the causes of World War I (“The Great War”), argues that Serbia was a “client state” only in the imaginations of Russia's leaders: It was a risk enhancing initiative [of Russian Foreign Minister Serge Sazanov] to allow Serbia to become to see Serbia as a kind of client; ... Serbia, to my knowledge, has never been a client of anyone. […] This is a mistake, when Great Powers think they can secure the services of “client states”; That Those “clients” are never in fact “clients”! That’s a mistake that is presumably going to continue being made by our political leaderships, though one hopes one day it will stop.

First French Empire and French Republic

During the Revolutionary and Napoleonic eras (1789–1815), France conquered most of western Europe and established several client states.

At first, during the French revolutionary wars these states were erected as "Républiques soeurs" ("sister republics"). They were established in Italy (Cisalpine Republic in Northern Italy, Parthenopean Republic in Southern Italy), Greece (Îles Ioniennes), Switzerland (Helvetic Republic and Rhodanic Republic), Belgium and the Netherlands (Batavian Republic).

During the First French Empire, while Napoleon I and the French army conquered Europe, such states changed, and several new states were formed. The Italian republics were transformed into the Kingdom of Italy under Napoleon's direct rule in the north, and the Kingdom of Naples in the south, first under Joseph Bonaparte's rule and later under Marshal Joachim Murat. A third state was created in the Italian Peninsula, the Kingdom of Etruria. The Batavian Republic was replaced by the Kingdom of Holland, ruled by Napoleon's third brother, Louis Bonaparte.

A total of 35 German states, all of them allies of France, seceded from the Holy Roman Empire to create the Confederation of the Rhine, a client state created to provide a buffer between France and its two largest enemies to the east, Prussia and Austria. Two of those states were Napoleonic creations: the huge Kingdom of Westphalia, which was controlled by Jerome Bonaparte, the Emperor's youngest brother; and the Grand Duchy of Würzburg.

Following the French invasion of the Iberian Peninsula, Spain too was turned into a client Kingdom of Spain under Joseph Bonaparte; as was Poland, then the Duchy of Warsaw.

In the 20th century, France started to apply the concept of Françafrique, its name for its former African colonies, sometimes extended to the former Belgian colonies. At present the term is used on some occasions to criticise the allegedly neocolonial relationship France has with its former colonies in Africa.

The countries involved provide oil and minerals important to the French economy. In addition, French companies have commercial interests in several countries of the continent.

British Empire

The Indian Princely States were nominally sovereign entities in the British Empire and in 1947, were given a choice to either accede to independent India or Pakistan or get independence (the Nizam of Hyderabad did opt for independence but his kingdom was invaded by Indian forces in 1948). Egyptian Independence in 1922 ended its brief status as a British protectorate and Iraq was made a kingdom in 1932. But in both cases, the economic and military reality did not amount to full independence, but a status where the local rulers were British clients. Other instances include Africa (e.g. Northern Nigeria under Lord Lugard), and the Unfederated Malay States; the policy of indirect rule.

Germany
After France was defeated in the Battle of France, Vichy France was established as a client state of Nazi Germany, which remained as such until 1942 when it was reduced to a puppet government until its liberation in 1944. Germany also established, in its newly conquered Eastern territories, client states including the Slovak Republic, the Croatian State and the Albanian Kingdom.

United States of America

The term has been applied to authoritarian regimes with close ties to the United States during the Cold War, also referred to as U.S. proxy states, such as South Vietnam, Iran until 1979, Cambodia under the regime of Lon Nol from 1970 to 1975, and the Philippines under Ferdinand Marcos from 1965 to 1986,  U.S. - Iran relations under Mohammad Reza Shah (reigned 1941 to 1979) have been cited as a modern political-science case-study.

 Chile (1973–1990)
 (1945–1979, on the island of Taiwan from 1949)
 (1941–1979)
 (from 1967)
 (1970–1975)

 (1965–1986)
 (1948–1953)
 (1955–1975)

The term has also been applied to states which are extremely economically dependent on a more powerful nation. The three Pacific Ocean countries associated with the United States under the Compact of Free Association (the Federated States of Micronesia, the Marshall Islands and Palau) have been called client states.

Imperial Japan

In the late 19th century, the Japanese Empire gradually reduced Joseon Korea's status to that of a client state. In the early 20th century, this was converted to direct rule. Manchukuo, in contrast, remained a puppet state throughout World War II.

 (from 9 March 1945 to 16 October 1945)
China (East Hebei Autonomous Government, Great Way Government, North Shanxi Autonomous Government)
 Great Way Government
 Provisional Government of the Republic of China
 Wang Jingwei regime
 (Post Sino-Japanese War)

 Kingdom of Luang Phrabang (1945)

 (current Okinawa Prefecture)
 (1942–1945)
 Empire of Vietnam

Soviet Union

Soviet proxy, "satellite" or "client" states included much of the Warsaw Pact nations whose policies were heavily influenced by Soviet military power and economic aid. Other third world nations with Marxist–Leninist governments were routinely criticized as being Soviet proxies as well, among them Cuba following the Cuban Revolution, the Democratic People's Republic of Korea, the People's Republic of Angola, the People's Republic of Mozambique, the Democratic Republic of Afghanistan, and the Democratic Republic of Vietnam (North Vietnam). Within the Soviet Union itself, the Ukrainian SSR and the Byelorussian SSR, had seats at the United Nations, but were actually proper Soviet territory.

Warsaw Pact and Comecon states:
 (1979–1991)
 (1946–1968)

 (1949–1990)

 
 (remained a de jure member in spite of the de-satellization of Romania)
 (North Vietnam to 1976)
 (1979–1989)
 (until the Sino-Soviet split)
 (1931–1937)
 (1974–1991 (Derg until 1987))

 (1949–1991)

 (until the Tito–Stalin split)

See also
Banana republic
Suzerain
Tributary (political)
Strategic autonomy

References

 
Sovereignty
Geopolitics